Melica amethystina is a grass species in the family Poaceae that can be found in southern Europe.

Description
It also has scabrous bottom which can also be glabrous or pilose. The main panicle branches are indistinct and almost racemose. Spikelets are solitary with fertile spikelets being pedicelled, pedicels of which are filiform and puberulous.

Glumes are reaching the apex of florets and are thinner than lemma. Lemma margins are ciliate and hairy on the bottom with obtuse apex. It has 2-veined palea with ciliolated keels. Both glumes are membranous, are purple in colour, have no keels, and are 5-veined. The apex of the upper glume is either acute or acuminate. Flowers have 3 stamens. Fruits are caryopses with an added pericarp and linear hilum.

References

amethystina
Flora of Europe